Victory Records is an American record label based in Chicago. Originally focusing on hardcore punk and post-hardcore bands, Victory later expanded its roster to include emo and pop rock acts.

Current bands

 Abandoned By Bears
 Awaken I Am
 Carousel Kings
 Colours 
 Cro-Mags (w/ Harley Flanagan)
 Conveyer
 Dead Girls Academy 
 Erimha
 For the Win
 Like Torches
 The Reverend Horton Heat
 Save The Lost Boys
 Seeker
 Shattered Sun
 The Tossers
 (R)Hopes & Dreams
Victorian Halls
 We Ride
 We Were Sharks

Former bands 

 1997
 A18
 Across Five Aprils
 Action Action
 Aiden
 All Out War
 Amber Pacific
 American Standards
 Arise and Ruin
 As They Burn
 Atreyu
 The Audition
 The Autumn Offering
 A Stained Glass Romance
 Baby Gopal
 Backfire
 Bad Brains
 Bayside
 Before There Was Rosalyn
 Beneath the Sky
 Between the Buried and Me
 Billingsgate
 Blackguard
 The Black Maria
 Blood for Blood
 Bloodlet
 Boysetsfire
 Broadside
 The Bunny The Bear
 Buried Alive
 Burning Heads
 Bury Your Dead
 By the Grace of God
 Carnifex
 Cast Iron Hike
 Catch 22 (band)
 Cause for Alarm
 Chase Long Beach
 Close Your Eyes
 Cockney Rejects
 Comeback Kid
 Continents
 Corpus Christi
 Count the Stars
 Counterparts
 Damnation A.D.
 Darkness Divided
 Darkest Hour
 A Day to Remember
 Dead to Fall
 Deadguy
 Design the Skyline 
 Despised Virtue
 Destrophy
 Doughnuts
 Dr. Acula
 Earth Crisis
 Electric Frankenstein
 Emmure
 Endwell
 Fall City Fall
 Farewell to Freeway
 Feed Her to the Sharks
 The Forecast
 ForeverAtLast
 Freya
 Funeral for a Friend (Distribution Only)
 Fury of Five
 Giles
 Glasseater
 God Forbid
 Grade
 Gravemaker
 Grey Area
 Guilt
 Hatebreed
 Hawthorne Heights
 A Hero A Fake
 Hi-Fi and the Roadburners
 Hoods
 House of Lords
 The Hurt Process
 Iceburn
 In Cold Blood
 Inner Strength
 Insight

 Integrity
 Ill Niño
 Islander
 Jamie's Elsewhere
 June
 The Junior Varsity
 Josh DeShano
 Jungle Rot
 Killing Time
 Kissing Candice
 L.E.S. Stitches
 LENR
 Lockweld
 Madball
 Madcap
 Martyr A.D.
 Meridian
 Minus
 Moros Eros
 Neurotic November
 Nights Like These
 No Innocent Victim
 Nodes of Ranvier
 On the Last Day
 One Life Crew
 OS101 (aka Old School 101)
 Otep
 Out of Order
 Pathology
 A Perfect Murder
 Premonitions of War
 Proud to Be Dead
 Raid
 Reach the Sky
 Refused
 The Reunion Show
 Right Direction
 Ringworm
 River City Rebels
 The Royalty
 Run Devil Run
 Scars of Tomorrow
 The Scenic
 Secret Lives of the Freemasons
 Shelter
 Shutdown
 Silverstein
 Sinai Beach
 Sister Sin
 Skarhead
 The Sleeping
 Smoking Popes
 Snapcase
 Snowdogs
 Somehow Hollow
 Snow White's Poison Bite
 Spitalfield
 Stigmata
 Straight Faced
 Straylight Run
 Streetlight Manifesto
 Strife
 The Strike
 Student Rick
 Taking Back Sunday
 Taproot
 Tear Out The Heart
 Ten Foot Pole
 Terror
 These Hearts
 Thieves and Villains
 Thumb
 Thursday
 Triumph
 Voodoo Glow Skulls
 The Warriors
 Warzone
 Waterdown
 William Control
 With Blood Comes Cleansing
 With Honor
 Within the Ruins
 Worlds Collide
 Wretched

References

External links
 Current band listing
 Band alumni listing
 We Are Triumphant listing

Victory Records
Victory Records artists